Theodoros Vardinogiannis Stadium is a stadium in Heraklion, Crete, Greece. It was built in 1951 (not at its present state) as the home stadium of OFI Crete. The stadium is commonly known by its nickname, Yedi Kule ("Seven Towers" in Turkish).

History
The historic ground of OFI was constructed in 1951 and after the death of the historic leader of the  club it was named "Theodoros Vardinoyannis". The opening of the stadium took place on November 11, 1951, with the football game of OFI Crete with the team of Α.Σ.Δ.Α.Ν. (English: A.S.D.A.N.) (something like the current national team) and the result was a defeat for OFI, 4–1, a result that had a little meaning compared with the benefits that the Cretan club had won. At last, the largest Cretan club acquired its own "home", that would roof all the faithful of the new football ideals developed in Iraklion, Crete.

The stadium was built on the ruins of an Armenian cemetery and that in the area where the pitch is located, there were two big holes, remaining structures of German army guns from the World War II occupation.

In 2018, the stadium had a match stats display added at the east side of the stadium.

Records
The stadium has a capacity of 8,500 fans, however many times the presence of the fans surpassed the number above. From 1980 to 2005 the stadium has held 380 matches. From 1979, the year when football in Greece became professional, the stadium has held 340 league games.

The highest attendance recorded at Yedi Kule is 12,391 for OFI's match against Olympiakos on September 25, 1988. For the record, OFI won the game 2–1.

Transportation
 Herakleion City Bus stops Sofokli Venizelou Kantanou and Kaminia (6,7,8,10,11,12,14,15,17,19,21,23,31)

Football venues in Greece
Buildings and structures in Heraklion
Sports venues in Crete